The Netball Super League is a five-month-long, 15-round netball tournament developed to cater for elite players in Singapore. It was established and is governed by Netball Singapore and six teams compete. The 2020 competition was won by the Sneakers Stingrays.

Teams
 As of 2020 (see here)

Previous winners

References

External links
 Netball Super League 2020 Homepage
 Netball Super League Official Handbook (2018)
Elite NSL Club Criteria

Netball leagues
Netball competitions in Singapore
Sports leagues in Singapore
2000 establishments in Singapore
Sports leagues established in 2000
Professional sports leagues in Singapore